Commercial Break (also known as Satisfaction, or Your Money Back) is a 1997 Italian black comedy film written and directed by Sandro Baldoni.

Plot 
An importer of Argentine meat has to deal with a large amount of rotting flesh full of maggots and decides to recycle it as dog food. It is then produced an advertisement that tries to get people to feed their pets with nutritious worms.

Cast 

Ennio Fantastichini: Giulio Stucchi
Ivano Marescotti: Gianfranco Pedone
Silvia Cohen: Wanda Crespi Cicogna
Mariella Valentini: Titti Melidoni
Carlo Croccolo: Ciro Esposito
Maurizio Crozza: Bonelli
Cosimo Cinieri: Prof. Gianluigi Querciasecca 
Barbara Cupisti: Mary Cantucci

References

External links

1997 films
Italian satirical films
1990s black comedy films
Films about advertising
Italian black comedy films
1997 comedy films
Films scored by Carlo Siliotto
1990s Italian-language films
1990s Italian films